The Miss Perú 1984 pageant was held on May 19, 1984. That year, 24 candidates were competing for the national crowns. The chosen winners represented Peru at the Miss Universe 1984 and Miss World 1984. The rest of the finalists would enter in different pageants.

Placements

Special Awards

 Best Regional Costume - Ucayali - Marlit Bartra
 Miss Congeniality - Lima - Patricia Cecchi

Delegates

Amazonas - Silvia Lazo de la Vega
Áncash -  Zita Pesagno
Arequipa - Yolanda Cáceres
Cuzco - Maritza Gonzales
Distrito Capital - Alicia Tillit
Huancavelica - Jessica Abugattás
Ica - Ada María Ubillus
Junín - Maria Elena Pinillos
La Libertad - Florencia Flores
Lambayeque - Martha Wiese
Mala - Ana Sofía Novella
Miraflores - Janny Navarro

Moquegua - Cecilia Chanove Collao
Piura - Ana María Puigrefagut
Region Lima - Fiorella Ferrari
Rímac - Ana María Aedo Joya
San Borja - Karina Torres Saric
Lima - Patricia Cecchi
Surco - Patricia Kuipers
Tacna - Sussy Gálvez
Trujillo - Cristina Loayza Guerra
Tumbes - Norma Infantes
Ucayali - Marlit Bartra
Urubamba - Giovanna Venero

Judges

 Carlos Gino Vásquez - Peruvian Basketball Player
 Rafael Puga -   Peruvian Bullfighter
 Silvia Higueras - Miss Maja International 1983
 Victor Hugo Vieira - Soap Opera Actor
 Pedro García Miró - Peruvian shooter & Captain of the national Olympic Team
 Cesar Calvo De Araujo - Peruvian Writer, Poet & journalist
 Inés de Ronalds - Manager of Las Dunas Hotel
 Eduardo Bonilla - Manager of Creaciones Sheila
 Baruch Ivcher - Manager of Paraiso
 Fernando Gomberoff - Manager of Beauty Form
 Francesca Zaza - Miss Peru 1982
 Mario Cavagnaro - Creative Director of Panamericana Televisión

.

References 

Miss Peru
1984 in Peru
1984 beauty pageants